Yir-Yoront was a Paman language spoken in two settlements, Kowanyama and Pormpuraaw on the southwestern part of the Cape York Peninsula, Queensland in Australia, by the Yir-Yoront people. In 1991 only 15 speakers remained, with the rest of the Yir-Yoront people speaking English or even Kuuk Thaayorre as many speakers of Yir-Yoront apparently are using Kuuk Thaayorre in daily conversation. At present it is thought to be extinct. There are two sister dialects, Yir-Yoront proper and Yirrk-Thangalkl, which are very close. The shared name Yir is sometimes used for both taken together.

Names 
The first part of both of the name, Yir, is from the word yirrq meaning speech or language. Following is the ethnonym.

Yir-Yoront is written hyphenated as a way of indicating that the syllable following the hyphen is stressed. In the standard orthography, it is correctly spelled Yirr-Yorront, with "rr" representing the consonant /r/. There is a valid alternative pronunciation with stress on the first syllable; this can be written YirrqYorront. Other spellings encountered include Yir Yoront and Jir Joront.

Other names for the language include:
 Yirr-Thuchm: Meaning "from the sandridges"
 Kok-Minychen: The name of the Yir-Yoront in the Koko-Bera language
 Koko-Minychena: Alternative spelling
 Kokomindjen: Alternative spelling
 Mandjoen: Alternative spelling
 Mind'jana: Alternative spelling
 Mundjun: Alternative spelling
 Myunduno: Alternative spelling
 Kuuk-Thaanhon: The name of the Yir-Yoront in the Kuuk Thaayorre language
 Gwandera: A name incorrectly applied to the Yir-Yoront people and their language
 Millera: No source available

Phonology 
The following description is for Yir-Yoront proper. For another dialect, see Yirrk-Thangalkl dialect.

Vowels 
Yir-Yoront has 6 vowels:

Consonants 
Yir-Yoront has 20 consonants:

Sign language

The Yir Yoront have (or had) a well-developed signed form of their language. It may have had some influence in the broader Far North Queensland Indigenous Sign Language, though it may have gone extinct too early for that.

External links 
 Paradisec has language materials for Yir Yoront as part of the Arthur Capell collection (AC1) and the Barry Alpher collection (BA1)

References

Notes

General 
 

Southwestern Paman languages
Extinct languages of Queensland
Indigenous Australian languages in Queensland